Hasan bin Bahrom (born 10 April 1956) is a Malaysian politician who served as the Member of Parliament (MP) for Tampin from May 2018 to November 2022 and Chancellor of the Malacca Islamic University College from September 2018 to April 2020. He is a member of the National Trust Party (AMANAH), a component party of the Pakatan Harapan (PH) opposition coalition.

Election result

Honour
  :
  Companion Class I of the Exalted Order of Malacca (DMSM) - Datuk (2018)

References

Living people
1956 births
People from Negeri Sembilan
Malaysian people of Malay descent
Malaysian Muslims
National Trust Party (Malaysia) politicians
Members of the Dewan Rakyat